Yu So-jeong (born 4 June 1996) is a South Korean handball player for SK Sugar Gliders and the South Korean national team.

She competed at the 2015 World Women's Handball Championship in Denmark.

References

External links

1996 births
Living people
South Korean female handball players
Handball players at the 2014 Summer Youth Olympics
Youth Olympic gold medalists for South Korea
Handball players at the 2016 Summer Olympics
Olympic handball players of South Korea
Handball players at the 2018 Asian Games
Asian Games gold medalists for South Korea
Asian Games medalists in handball
Medalists at the 2018 Asian Games
Universiade medalists in handball
Universiade silver medalists for South Korea
Medalists at the 2015 Summer Universiade
21st-century South Korean women